Amaury Miguel García (born May 20, 1975) is a former Major League Baseball second baseman and current hitting coach for the Hagerstown Suns. He played for the Florida Marlins for ten games during the 1999 Florida Marlins season.

References

External links

1975 births
Brevard County Manatees players
Calgary Cannons players
Charlotte Knights players
Dominican Republic expatriate baseball players in Canada
Dominican Republic expatriate baseball players in Italy
Dominican Republic expatriate baseball players in Mexico
Dominican Republic expatriate baseball players in South Korea
Dominican Republic expatriate baseball players in the United States
Elmira Pioneers players
Florida Marlins players
Gulf Coast Marlins players
Hanwha Eagles players
Kane County Cougars players

Living people
Major League Baseball players from the Dominican Republic
Major League Baseball second basemen
Mexican League baseball outfielders
Mexican League baseball second basemen
Mexican League baseball shortstops
Minor league baseball coaches
Piratas de Campeche players
Portland Sea Dogs players
Rojos del Águila de Veracruz players
Winnipeg Goldeyes players
Rimini Baseball Club players
Azucareros del Este players
Cañeros de Los Mochis players
Dominican Republic expatriate baseball players in Taiwan
Macoto Cobras players